Roman Erat (born 12 May 1979 in Třebíč) is a Czech professional ice hockey player who currently plays with HC Kometa Brno in the Czech Extraliga.

Erat previously played for SK Horácká Slavia Třebíč and HC Znojemští Orli.

References

External links

Czech ice hockey forwards
HC Kometa Brno players
Orli Znojmo players
Living people
Sportspeople from Třebíč
1979 births
Wipptal Broncos players
BK Havlíčkův Brod players
Czech expatriate ice hockey people
Czech expatriate sportspeople in Italy
Expatriate ice hockey players in Italy